Palivere is a small borough in Lääne-Nigula Parish, Lääne County in western Estonia.

References

Boroughs and small boroughs in Estonia
Kreis Wiek